Our Lady of Maryknoll Hospital is a Roman Catholic   hospital at Wong Tai Sin area in New Kowloon of Hong Kong.

History
Our Lady of Maryknoll Hospital was founded by the Maryknoll Sisters and officially opened by D. J. M. Mackenzie, Director of Medical and Health Services, on 11 December 1961.

It became a public hospital in 1991.

Services
, the hospital has 236 beds and around 721 members of staff. For the year ended 31 March 2013, it has treated 10,290 inpatients and day-patients, 67,350 specialist outpatients, and 415,159 general outpatients.

References

External links

Web page at the Hospital Authority website

Hospital buildings completed in 1961
Hospitals in Hong Kong
Catholic hospitals in Asia
Medical Services by Catholic community in Hong Kong
Wong Tai Sin
Hospitals established in 1961
1961 establishments in Hong Kong